"I'm Still Here" is a song written by Stephen Sondheim for the 1971 musical Follies.

Production
"I'm Still Here" was introduced in the musical Follies, which premiered on Broadway at the Winter Garden Theatre on April 4, 1971. The song is sung by former Follies showgirl, Carlotta Campion. The role was originally played by Yvonne De Carlo.

Other performers who have played Carlotta in Follies on Broadway include Ann Miller in the 1998 Paper Mill Playhouse production, Polly Bergen in the 2001 revival and Elaine Paige in the 2011 revival. In the 1987 West End production, Carlotta was played by Dolores Gray. She was played by Tracie Bennett in the recent National Theatre production.

Since the original production many performers have included the song as part of their concert performances, often rewriting it to reflect their own careers, including Barbra Streisand, Eartha Kitt and Sammy Davis Jr.

Background
"I'm Still Here" was written during the out of town tryout for Follies in Boston, when Sondheim decided that another song ("Can That Boy Foxtrot") was not working. This song had been written as a throwaway song for a minor character, but Yvonne De Carlo was a high-profile name in the cast, and the creative team felt she deserved a more substantial song. The librettist James Goldman suggested it should be a song about survival that said 'I'm still here.' Sondheim borrowed the phrase for the song title.
It is an example of a "list song". Sondheim noted that "the song develops through decades" (p. 181). Stephen Banfield describes it as "a blues song" (p. 183).
The tune was written as a pastiche of Harold Arlen, one of Sondheim's favorite Broadway composers.

June Abernathy provided an explanation of some of the terms and references in the song. For example, in the phrase "I’ve slept in shanties, Guest of the W.P.A.", "W.P.A." means the Works Projects Administration (1935–43), a U.S. government agency. "Windsor and Wally’s affair" refers to King Edward VIII, King of England in 1936, and Wallis Warfield Simpson, an American divorcee.

Synopsis
Carlotta is a former showgirl who became a movie star and later a nightclub performer and television star. In this song she sings about the many adventures she has been through during her long career, and explains that she has outlived it all. She describes rising from poverty during the Great Depression through luck and perseverance despite limited training. The next verses describe surviving the excesses of show business success, including alcoholism, drug addiction and rehabilitation, as well as going through the Hollywood Blacklist.

Sondheim loosely based the song on the career of Joan Crawford, stating "She [Crawford] started as a silent film-star, then she became a sound-star, and she eventually became superannuated and started to do camp movies [...] she became a joke on and of herself, but she survived." This shows up in the line 'First you're another sloe-eyed vamp/ Then someone's mother/ then you're camp/ then you career from career to career/ I'm almost through my memoirs/ and I'm here!'

What makes the song interesting and poignant is the very real mixture of emotions of an older person reviewing her life, seeing how the good and the bad in life are bound to come, alternately or sometimes simultaneously, and in having reached a certain age there is a sense of both cynicism and triumph. This mixture is expressed in the emotional impact of the music itself, which gradually begins to swell as the song progresses from what starts as a nightclub lounge-act performance into a brassy big-band cabaret style finish.

As she goes through an outline of her life, skimming through the pages of her mental scrapbook, she builds up to the realization that, good or bad, she managed to get through her life and that she is a survivor. With that realization there is a confidence and a sense of triumph, but with an edge to it. Some youthful tenderness has to be left behind, but "what does not kill you, makes you stronger".

Critical reception
Variety describes the song as "electric". The New York Times called it "the song of the survivor". Elaine Stritch told Stephen Sondheim that an actress has only earned the right to perform the song once they reach 80. She expressed her frustration that the many women who perform the song in their forties, fifties, and even sixties, lack the life experience necessary, demanding to know "where have they been?"

Recordings
Many performers have recorded the song, including cast albums and other recordings. Among them are: Yvonne DeCarlo in the original 1971 Broadway production;
Nancy Walker in Sondheim: A Musical Tribute (1973); Millicent Martin in Side by Side by Sondheim (1976); Gemma Craven in Songs of Sondheim (1977); Carol Burnett in Follies in Concert (1985); Julie Wilson in Sings the Stephen Sondheim Songbook (1988); Cleo Laine in Cleo Sings Sondheim (1988); Dorothy Loudon in The Stephen Sondheim Album (2000); Elaine Stritch in At Liberty (2002) and Sondheim the Birthday Concert (2010); Elaine Paige in 2011 Broadway Revival Cast Recording; and Shirley Bassey in Hello Like Before (2014).

In popular culture
The character Frederica Norman, played by Patti LuPone, sang the song in Pose, season 2, episode 6.

The character Doris Mann, played by Shirley MacLaine, sang the song in Postcards from the Edge. At the request of director Mike Nichols, Stephen Sondheim wrote special lyrics for MacLaine to sing in the film.

The character Lillian Bennett, played by Carol Burnett, sang the song in Touched by an Angel season 4, episode 10: "The Comeback". Burnett also sang the song in character as Carlotta in Follies in Concert (1985).

The character Kurt Hummel, played by Chris Colfer, sang the song in a Glee episode in a Sondheim tribute episode in season five. TVLine gave the performance an "A".

References

External links
Internet Broadway Database Follies 1971

1971 songs
Songs from musicals
Songs written by Stephen Sondheim